Henricus Antonius "Han" van Meegeren (10 October 1889 – 30 December 1947) was a Dutch painter and portraitist, considered one of the most ingenious art forgers of the 20th century. Van Meegeren became a national hero after World War II when it was revealed that he had sold a forged painting to Reichsmarschall Hermann Göring during the Nazi occupation of the Netherlands.

As a child, Van Meegeren developed an enthusiasm for the paintings of the Dutch Golden Age, and he set out to become an artist. Art critics, however, decried his work as tired and derivative, and Van Meegeren felt that they had destroyed his career. He decided to prove his talent by forging paintings by 17th-century artists including Frans Hals, Pieter de Hooch, Gerard ter Borch and Johannes Vermeer. The best art critics and experts of the time accepted the paintings as genuine and sometimes exquisite. His most successful forgery was Supper at Emmaus, created in 1937 while he was living in the south of France; the painting was hailed as a real Vermeer by leading experts of the day such as Dr Abraham Bredius.

During World War II, Göring traded 137 paintings for one of Van Meegeren's false Vermeers, and it became one of his most prized possessions. Following the war, Van Meegeren was arrested, as officials believed that he had sold Dutch cultural property to the Nazis. Facing a possible death penalty, Van Meegeren confessed to the less serious charge of forgery. He was convicted on falsification and fraud charges on 12 November 1947, after a brief but highly publicised trial, and was sentenced to one year in prison. He did not serve out his sentence however; he died on 30 December 1947 in the Valerius Clinic in Amsterdam, after two heart attacks. A biography in 1967 estimated that Van Meegeren duped buyers out of the equivalent of more than US$30 million (approximately US$254 million in 2022); his victims included the government of the Netherlands.

Early years
Han (a diminutive version of Henri or Henricus) van Meegeren was born in 1889 as the third of five children of middle-class Roman Catholic parents in the provincial city of Deventer. He was the son of Augusta Louisa Henrietta Camps and Hendrikus Johannes van Meegeren, a French and history teacher at the Kweekschool (training college for schoolteachers) in the city of Deventer.

Early on, Han felt neglected and misunderstood by his father, as the elder Van Meegeren strictly forbade his artistic development and constantly derided him. His father often forced him to write a hundred times, "I know nothing, I am nothing, I am capable of nothing." While attending the Higher Burger School, he met teacher and painter Bartus Korteling (1853–1930) who became his mentor. Korteling had been inspired by Johannes Vermeer and showed Van Meegeren how Vermeer had manufactured and mixed his colours. Korteling had rejected the Impressionist movement and other modern trends as decadent, degenerate art, and his strong personal influence probably led van Meegeren to rebuff contemporary styles and paint exclusively in the style of the Dutch Golden Age.

Van Meegeren's father did not share his son's love of art; instead, he compelled him to study architecture at the Technische Hogeschool (Delft Technical College) in Delft in 1907, the hometown of Johannes Vermeer. He received drawing and painting lessons, as well. He easily passed his preliminary examinations but he never took the Ingenieurs (final) examination because he did not want to become an architect. He nevertheless proved to be an apt architect and designed the clubhouse for his rowing club in Delft which still exists (see image).

In 1913, Van Meegeren gave up his architecture studies and concentrated on drawing and painting at the art school in The Hague. On 8 January 1913, he received the prestigious Gold Medal from the Technical University in Delft for his Study of the Interior of the Church of Saint Lawrence (Laurenskerk) in Rotterdam. The award was given every five years to an art student who created the best work, and was accompanied by a gold medal.

On 18 April 1912, Van Meegeren married fellow art student Anna de Voogt who was pregnant with their first child. The couple initially lived with Anna's grandmother in Rijswijk, and their son Jacques Henri Emil was born there on 26 August 1912. Jacques van Meegeren also became a painter; he died on 26 October 1977 in Amsterdam.

Career as a legitimate painter

In the summer of 1914, Van Meegeren moved his family to Scheveningen. That year, he completed the diploma examination at the Royal Academy of Art in The Hague. The diploma allowed him to teach, and he took a position as the assistant to Professor Gips, the Professor of Drawing and Art History, for the small monthly salary of 75 guldens. In March 1915, his daughter Pauline was born, later called Inez. To supplement his income, Han sketched posters and painted pictures for the commercial art trade, generally Christmas cards, still-life, landscapes, and portraits. Many of these paintings are quite valuable today.

Van Meegeren showed his first paintings publicly in The Hague, where they were exhibited from April to May 1917 at the Kunstzaal Pictura. In December 1919, he was accepted as a select member by the Haagse Kunstkring, an exclusive society of writers and painters who met weekly on the premises of the Ridderzaal. Although he had been accepted, he was ultimately denied the position of chairman. He painted the tame roe deer belonging to Princess Juliana in his studio at The Hague, opposite the Royal Palace Huis ten Bosch. He made many sketches and drawings of the deer, and painted Hertje (The fawn) in 1921, which became quite popular in the Netherlands. He undertook numerous journeys to Belgium, France, Italy, and England, and acquired a name for himself as a talented portraitist. He earned stately fees through commissions from English and American socialites who spent their winter vacations on the Côte d'Azur. His clients were impressed by his understanding of the 17th-century techniques of the Dutch masters. Throughout his life, Van Meegeren signed his own paintings with his own signature.

By all accounts, infidelity was responsible for the breakup of Van Meegeren's marriage to Anna de Voogt; the couple were divorced on 19 July 1923. Anna left with the children and moved to Paris where Van Meegeren visited his children from time to time. He now dedicated himself to portraiture and began producing forgeries to increase his income.

He married actress Johanna Theresia Oerlemans in Woerden in 1928, with whom he had been living for the past three years. Johanna was also known under her stage name of Jo van Walraven, and she had previously been married to art critic and journalist Dr. C H. de Boer (Carel de Boer). She brought their daughter Viola into the Van Meegeren household.

The forgeries

Van Meegeren had become a well-known painter in the Netherlands, and Hertje (1921) and Straatzangers (1928) were particularly popular. His first legitimate copies were painted in 1923, his Laughing Cavalier and Happy Smoker, both in the style of Frans Hals. By 1928, the similarity of Van Meegeren's paintings to those of the Old Masters began to draw the reproach of Dutch art critics, who were more interested in Cubism, Surrealism, and other modern movements. It was said that his gift was an imitation and that his talent was limited outside of copying other artists' work. 

One critic wrote that he was "a gifted technician who has made a sort of composite facsimile of the Renaissance school, he has every virtue except originality". In response to these comments, Van Meegeren published a series of aggressive articles in his monthly magazine De Kemphaan ("The Ruff"). Jonathan Lopez writes in his book on the forger that in the magazine he "denounced modern painting as 'art-Bolshevism,' described its proponents as a 'slimy bunch of woman-haters and negro-lovers,' and invoked the image of 'a Jew with a handcart' as a symbol for the international art market". Along with journalist Jan Ubink, this periodical was published between April 1928 and March 1930.

Van Meegeren felt that his genius had been misjudged, and he set out to prove to the art critics that he could more than copy the Dutch Masters; he would produce a work so magnificent that it would rival theirs. He moved with Jo to the South of France and began preparations for this ultimate forgery, which took him from 1932 to 1937. In a series of early exercises, he forged works by Frans Hals, Pieter de Hooch, Gerard ter Borch, and Johannes Vermeer. Finally, he chose to forge a painting by Vermeer as his masterpiece. Vermeer had not been particularly well known until the beginning of the twentieth century; his works were both extremely valuable and scarce, as only about 35 had survived.

Van Meegeren delved into the biographies of the Old Masters, studying their lives, occupations, trademark techniques, and catalogues. In October 1932, art connoisseur and Rembrandt expert Dr. Abraham Bredius published an article about two recently discovered alleged Vermeer paintings, which he defined as Landscape and Man and Woman at a Spinet. He claimed the former to be a fake, and described it as "a landscape of the eighteenth century into which had been imported scraps of the 'View of Delft'" (mostly the Delft New Church's tower). On the contrary, the Man and Woman at a Spinet not only was judged as an "authentic Vermeer", but also "very beautiful", and "one of the finest gems of the master's œuvre". The painting was later sold to Amsterdam banker Dr. Fritz Mannheimer.

The "perfect forgery"
In 1932, Van Meegeren moved to the village of Roquebrune-Cap-Martin with his wife. There he rented a furnished mansion called "Primavera" and set out to define the chemical and technical procedures that would be necessary to create his perfect forgeries. He bought authentic 17th century canvases and mixed his own paints from raw materials (such as lapis lazuli, white lead, indigo, and cinnabar) using old formulas to ensure that they could pass as authentic. In addition, he created his own badger-hair paintbrushes similar to those that Vermeer was known to have used. He came up with a scheme of using phenol formaldehyde (Bakelite) to cause the paints to harden after application, making the paintings appear as if they were 300 years old. Van Meegeren would first mix his paints with lilac oil, to stop the colours from fading or yellowing in heat. (This caused his studio to smell so strongly of lilacs that he kept a vase of fresh lilacs nearby so that visitors wouldn't be suspicious.) Later, he would wash the painting in black India ink to fill in the cracks.

It took Van Meegeren six years to work out his techniques, but ultimately he was pleased with his work on both artistic and deceptive levels. Two of these trial paintings were painted as if by Vermeer: Lady Reading Music, after the genuine paintings Woman in Blue Reading a Letter at the Rijksmuseum in Amsterdam; and Lady Playing Music, after Vermeer's Woman With a Lute Near a Window hanging in the Metropolitan Museum of Art in New York City. Van Meegeren did not sell these paintings; both are now at the Rijksmuseum.

Following a journey to the 1936 Summer Olympics in Berlin, Van Meegeren painted The Supper at Emmaus using the lapis lazuli (ultramarine blues) and yellows used by Johannes Vermeer and other Dutch Golden Age painters. In 1934 Van Meegeren had bought a seventeenth century mediocre Dutch painting, The Awakening of Lazarus, and on this foundation he created his masterpiece à la Vermeer. The experts assumed that Vermeer had studied in Italy, so Van Meegeren used the version of Michelangelo Merisi da Caravaggio's Supper at Emmaus located at Italy's Pinacoteca di Brera as a model. He had always wanted to walk in the steps of the masters, and he felt that his forgery was a fine work in its own right. He gave it to his friend, attorney C. A. Boon, telling him that it was a genuine Vermeer, and asked him to show it to Dr. Abraham Bredius, the art historian, in Monaco. Bredius examined the forgery in September 1937 and, writing in The Burlington Magazine, he accepted it as a genuine Vermeer and praised it very highly as "the masterpiece of Johannes Vermeer of Delft".
The usually required evidences, such as resilience of colours against chemical solutions, white lead analysis, x-rays images, micro-spectroscopy of the colouring substances, confirmed it to be an authentic Vermeer.

The painting was purchased by The Rembrandt Society for fl.520,000 (€235,000 or about €4,640,000 today), with the aid of wealthy shipowner Willem van der Vorm, and donated to the Museum Boijmans Van Beuningen in Rotterdam. In 1938, the piece was highlighted in a special exhibition in occasion of Queen Wilhelmina's Jubilee at a Rotterdam museum, along with 450 Dutch old masters dating from 1400 to 1800. A. Feulner wrote in the "Magazine for [the] History of Art", "In the rather isolated area in which the Vermeer picture hung, it was as quiet as in a chapel. The feeling of the consecration overflows on the visitors, although the picture has no ties to ritual or church", and despite the presence of masterpieces of Rembrandt and Grünewald, it was defined as "the spiritual centre" of the whole exhibition.

In the summer of 1938, Van Meegeren moved to Nice, using the proceeds from the sale of The Supper at Emmaus to buy a 12-bedroom estate at Les Arènes de Cimiez. On the walls of the estate hung several genuine Old Masters. Two of his better forgeries were made here, Interior with Card Players and Interior with Drinkers, both displaying the signature of Pieter de Hooch. During his time in Nice, he painted his Last Supper I in the style of Vermeer.

He returned to the Netherlands in September 1939 as the Second World War threatened. He remained at a hotel in Amsterdam for several months and moved to the village of Laren in 1940. Throughout 1941, Van Meegeren issued his designs, which he published in 1942 as a large and luxurious book entitled Han van Meegeren: Teekeningen I (Drawings nr I). He also created several forgeries during this time, including The Head of Christ, The Last Supper II, The Blessing of Jacob, The Adulteress, and The Washing of the Feet—all in the manner of Vermeer. On 18 December 1943, he divorced his wife, but this was only a formality; the couple remained together, but a large share of his capital was transferred to her accounts as a safeguard against the uncertainties of the war.

In December 1943, the Van Meegerens moved to Amsterdam where they took up residence in the exclusive Keizersgracht 321. His forgeries had earned him between 5.5 and 7.5 million guilders (or about US$25–30 million today). He used this money to purchase a large amount of real estate, jewellery, and works of art, and to further his luxurious lifestyle. In a 1946 interview, he told Marie Louise Doudart de la Grée that he owned 52 houses and 15 country houses around Laren, among them grachtenhuizen,  mansions along Amsterdam's canals.

Hermann Göring

In 1942, during the German occupation of the Netherlands, one of Van Meegeren's agents sold the Vermeer forgery Christ with the Adulteress to Nazi banker and art dealer Alois Miedl. Experts could probably have identified it as a forgery; as Van Meegeren's health declined, so did the quality of his work. He chain-smoked, drank heavily, and became addicted to morphine-laced sleeping pills. However, there were no genuine Vermeers available for comparison, since most museum collections were in protective storage as a prevention against war damage.

Nazi Reichsmarschall Hermann Göring traded 137 looted paintings for Christ with the Adulteress, and showcased it at his residence in Carinhall (about 65 kilometers; 40 miles north of Berlin). On 25 August 1943, Göring hid his collection of looted artwork, including Christ with the Adulteress, in an Austrian salt mine, along with 6,750 other pieces of artwork looted by the Nazis. On 17 May 1945, Allied forces entered the salt mine and Captain Harry Anderson discovered the painting.

In May 1945, the Allied forces questioned Miedl regarding the newly discovered Vermeer. Based on Miedl's confession, the painting was traced back to Van Meegeren. On 29 May 1945, he was arrested and charged with fraud and aiding and abetting the enemy. He was remanded to the Weteringschans prison as an alleged Nazi collaborator and plunderer of Dutch cultural property, threatened by the authorities with the death penalty. He labored over his predicament, but eventually confessed to forging paintings attributed to Vermeer and Pieter de Hooch. He exclaimed, "The painting in Göring's hands is not, as you assume, a Vermeer of Delft, but a Van Meegeren! I painted the picture!" It took some time to verify this and Van Meegeren was detained for several months in the Headquarters of the Military Command at Herengracht 458 in Amsterdam.

Van Meegeren painted his last forgery between July and December 1945 in the presence of reporters and court-appointed witnesses: Jesus among the Doctors, also called Young Christ in the Temple in the style of Vermeer. After completing the painting, he was transferred to the fortress prison Blauwkapel. Van Meegeren was released from prison in January or February 1946.

Trial and prison sentence
The trial of Han van Meegeren began on 29 October 1947 in Room 4 of the Regional Court in Amsterdam. The collaboration charges had been dropped, since the expert panel had found that the supposed Vermeer sold to Hermann Göring had been a forgery and was, therefore, not the cultural property of the Netherlands. Public prosecutor H. A. Wassenbergh brought charges of forgery and fraud and demanded a sentence of two years in prison.

The court commissioned an international group of experts to address the authenticity of Van Meegeren's paintings. The commission included curators, professors, and doctors from the Netherlands, Belgium, and England, and was led by the director of the chemical laboratory at the Royal Museums of Fine Arts of Belgium, Paul B. Coremans. The commission examined the eight Vermeer and Frans Hals paintings which Van Meegeren had identified as forgeries. With the help of the commission, Dr Coremans was able to determine the chemical composition of van Meegeren's paints.

He found that Van Meegeren had prepared the paints by using the phenolformaldehyde resins Bakelite and Albertol as paint hardeners. A bottle with exactly that ingredient had been found in Van Meegeren's studio. This chemical component was introduced and manufactured in the 20th century, proving that the alleged works by Vermeer and Frans Hals examined by the commission were in fact fabricated by Van Meegeren.

The commission's other findings suggested that the dust in the craquelure was too homogeneous to be of natural origin. The matter found in the craquelure appeared to come from India ink, which had accumulated even in areas that natural dirt or dust would never have reached. The paint had become so hard that alcohol, strong acids, and bases did not attack the surface, a clear indication that the surface had not been formed in a natural manner. The craquelure on the surface did not always match that in the ground layer, which would certainly have been the case with a natural craquelure. Thus, the test results obtained by the commission appeared to confirm that the works were forgeries created by Van Meegeren, but their authenticity continued to be debated by some of the experts until 1967 and 1977, when new investigative techniques were used to analyze the paintings (see below).

On 12 November 1947, the Fourth Chamber of the Amsterdam Regional Court found Han van Meegeren guilty of forgery and fraud, and sentenced him to one year in prison.

Death
While waiting to be moved to prison, Van Meegeren returned to his house at 321 Keizersgracht, where his health continued to decline. During this last month of his life, he strolled freely around his neighbourhood.

Van Meegeren suffered a heart attack on 26 November 1947, the last day to appeal the ruling, and was rushed to the Valeriuskliniek, a hospital in Amsterdam. While at the hospital, he suffered a second heart attack on 29 December, and was pronounced dead at 5:00 pm on 30 December 1947 at the age of 58. Soon after his death, a plaster death mask was made, which was acquired by the Rijksmuseum in 2014. His family and several hundred of his friends attended his funeral at the Driehuis Westerveld Crematorium chapel. In 1948, his urn was buried in the general cemetery in the village of Diepenveen (municipality of Deventer).

Aftermath

After his death, the court ruled that Van Meegeren's estate be auctioned and the proceeds from his property and the sale of his counterfeits be used to refund the buyers of his works and to pay income taxes on the sale of his paintings. Van Meegeren had filed for bankruptcy in December 1945. On 5 and 6 September 1950, the furniture and other possessions in his Amsterdam house at Keizersgracht 321 were auctioned by order of the court, along with 738 other pieces of furniture and works of art, including numerous paintings by old and new masters from his private collection. The house was auctioned separately on 4 September, estimated to be worth 65,000 guilders.

The proceeds of the sale together with the house amounted to 123,000 guilders. Van Meegeren's unsigned The Last Supper I was bought for 2,300 guilders, while Jesus among the Doctors (which Van Meegeren had painted while in detention) sold for 3,000 guilders (about US$800 or about US$7,000 today.) Today the painting hangs in a Johannesburg church. The sale of the entire estate amounted to 242,000 guilders (US$60,000, or about US$500,000 today).

Throughout his trial and bankruptcy, Van Meegeren maintained that his second wife Jo had nothing to do with the creation and sale of his forgeries. A large part of his considerable wealth, the estimated profits of his forgery having exceeded US$50 million in today's value, had been transferred to her when they were divorced during the war, and the money would have been confiscated if she had been ruled to be an accomplice. Van Meegeren told the same story to all authors, journalists, and biographers: "Jo didn't know", and apparently most believed him. Some biographers believe, however, that Jo must have known the truth. Her involvement was never proven and she was able to keep her substantial capital. Jo outlived her husband by many years, in luxury, until her death at the age of 91.

M. Jean Decoen's objection
M. Jean Decoen, a Brussels art expert and restorer, stated in his 1951 book he believed The Supper at Emmaus and The Last Supper II to be genuine Vermeers. Decoen went on to state that conclusions of Dr. Paul Coremans's panel of experts were wrong and that the paintings should again be examined. He also claimed in the book that Van Meegeren used these paintings as a model for his forgeries. Daniel George Van Beuningen was the buyer of The Last Supper II, Interior with Drinkers, and The Head of Christ, and he demanded that Dr. Paul Coremans publicly admit that he had erred in his analysis. Coremans refused and van Beuningen sued him, alleging that Coremans's wrongful branding of The Last Supper II diminished the value of his "Vermeer" and asking for compensation of £500,000 (about US$1.3 million or about US$10 million today). 

The first trial in Brussels was won by Coremans just because the court adopted the same reasoning of the court ruling at the time of the Amsterdam trial against Van Meegeren. A second trial was set for 2 June 1955 but was delayed owing to Van Beuningen's death on 29 May 1955. 
In 1958 the court heard the case on behalf of Van Beuningen's heirs. Coremans managed to give the definitive evidence of the forgeries by showing a photograph of a Hunting Scene, attributed to A. Hondius, exactly the same scene which was visible with X-ray under the surface of the alleged Vermeer's Last Supper. Moreover, Coremans brought a witness to the courtroom who confirmed that Van Meegeren bought the Hunt scene in 1940. The court found in favour of Coremans, and the findings of his commission were upheld.

Further investigations
In 1967, the Artists Material Center at Carnegie Mellon University in Pittsburgh examined several of the "Vermeers" in their collection, under the direction of Robert Feller and Bernard Keisch. The examination confirmed that several of their paintings were in fact created using materials invented in the 20th century. They concluded that the "Vermeers" in their possession were modern and could thus be Van Meegeren forgeries. This confirmed the findings of the 1946 Coremans commission, and refuted the claims made by M. Jean Decoen. The test results obtained by the Carnegie Mellon team are summarized below.

Han van Meegeren knew that white lead was used during Vermeer's time, but of course he had to obtain his stocks through the modern colour trade, which had changed significantly since the 17th century. During Vermeer's time, Dutch lead was mined from deposits located in the Low Countries; however, by the 19th century, most lead was imported from Australia and the Americas, and differed from the white lead that Vermeer would have used both in the isotope composition of the lead and in the content of trace elements found in the ores. Dutch white lead was extracted from ores containing high levels of trace elements of silver and antimony, while the modern white lead used by Van Meegeren contained neither silver nor antimony, as those elements are separated from the lead during the modern smelting process.

Forgeries in which modern lead or white lead pigment has been used can be recognized by using a technique called Pb(Lead)-210-Dating. Pb-210 is a naturally occurring radioactive isotope of lead that is part of the uranium-238 Radioactive decay series, and has a half-life of 22.3 years. To determine the amount of Pb-210, the alpha radiation emitted by another element, polonium-210 (Po-210), is measured. Thus it is possible to estimate the age of a painting, within a few years' span, by extrapolating the Pb-210 content present in the paint used to create the painting.

The white lead in the painting The Supper at Emmaus had polonium-210 values of 8.5±1.4 and radium-226 (part of the uranium-238 radioactive decay series) values of 0.8±0.3. In contrast, the white lead found in Dutch paintings from 1600 to 1660 had polonium-210 values of 0.23±0.27 and radium-226 values of 0.40±0.47.

In 1977, another investigation was undertaken by the States forensic labs of the Netherlands using up-to-date techniques, including gas chromatography, to formally confirm the origin of six van Meegeren forgeries that had been alleged to be genuine Vermeers, including the Emmaus and the Last Supper. The conclusions of the 1946 commission were again reaffirmed and upheld by the Dutch judicial system.

In 1998, A&E ran a program called Scams, Schemes & Scoundrels highlighting Van Meegeren's life and art forgeries, many of which had been confiscated as Nazi loot. The program was hosted by skeptic James Randi and also featured the stories of Victor Lustig and Soapy Smith.

In July 2011, the BBC TV programme Fake or Fortune investigated a copy of Dirck van Baburen's The Procuress owned by the Courtauld Institute. Opinion had been divided as to whether it was a 17th-century studio work or a Van Meegeren fake. The programme used chemical analysis of the paint to show that it contained bakelite and thus confirmed that the painting was a 20th-century fake.

Legacy

Van Meegeren played different roles, some of which were shrouded in fraudulent intentions, as he sought to fulfill his goal of besting his critics. His father was said to have once told him, "You are a cheat and always will be." He sent a signed copy of his own art book to Adolf Hitler, which turned up in the Reich Chancellery in Berlin complete with an inscription (in German): "To my beloved Führer in grateful tribute, from H. van Meegeren, Laren, North Holland, 1942". He only admitted the signature was his own, although the entire inscription was by the same hand. (The book by Jonathan Lopez confirmed the accuracy of Jan Spierdijk's article in De Waarheid in which Spierdijk reported details about Van Meegeren's book Tekeningen 1 being found in Hitler's library.) He bought up homes of several departed Jewish families in Amsterdam and held lavish parties while much of the country was hungry. On the other hand, his brothers and sisters perceived him as loyal, generous, and affectionate, and he was always loving and helpful to his own children.

In 2008, Harvard-trained art historian Jonathan Lopez had become fluent in Dutch and published The Man Who Made Vermeers, Unvarnishing the Legend of Master Forger Han Van Meegeren. His extensive research confirmed that Van Meegeren started to make forgeries, not so much by feeling misunderstood and undervalued by art critics as for the income that it generated, income which he needed to support his addictions and promiscuity.

Van Meegeren continued to paint after he was released from prison, signing his works with his own name. His new-found profile ensured quick sales of his new paintings, often selling at prices that were many times higher than before he had been unmasked as a forger. Van Meegeren also told the news media that he had "an offer from a Manhattan gallery to come to the U.S. and paint portraits 'in the 17th-century manner' at US$6,000 a throw".

A Dutch opinion poll conducted in October 1947 placed Han van Meegeren's popularity second in the nation, behind only the Prime Minister's and slightly ahead of Prince Bernhard, the husband of Princess Juliana. The Dutch people viewed Van Meegeren as a cunning trickster who had successfully fooled the Dutch art experts and, more importantly, Hermann Göring himself. In fact, according to a contemporary account, Göring was informed that his "Vermeer" was actually a forgery and "[Göring] looked as if for the first time he had discovered there was evil in the world". Lopez, however, suggests Göring may never have known the painting was a fake.

Lopez indicates that Han van Meegeren's defence during his trial in Amsterdam was a masterpiece of trickery, forging his own personality into a true Dutchman eager to trick his critics and also the Dutch people by pretending that he sold Christ and the Adulteress, a fake Vermeer, to Göring because he wanted to teach the Nazi a lesson. Van Meegeren remains one of the most ingenious art counterfeiters of the 20th century. After his trial, however, he declared, "My triumph as a counterfeiter was my defeat as [a] creative artist."

List of forgeries

Known forgeries

List of known forgeries by Han van Meegeren (unless specified differently, they are after Vermeer):
 A counterpart to Laughing Cavalier after Frans Hals (1923) once the subject of a scandal in The Hague in 1923, its present whereabouts is unknown.
The Happy Smoker after Frans Hals (1923) hangs in the Groninger Museum in the Netherlands
Man and Woman at a Spinet 1932 (perhaps without misleading intentions, sold to Amsterdam banker, Dr. Fritz Mannheimer)
Lady reading a letter 1935–1936 (unsold, on display at the Rijksmuseum)
Lady playing a lute and looking out the window 1935–1936 (unsold, on display at the Rijksmuseum)
Portrait of a Man 1935–1936 in the style of Gerard ter Borch (unsold, on display at the Rijksmuseum)
Woman Drinking (version of Malle Babbe) 1935–1936 (unsold, on display at the Rijksmuseum.)
The Supper at Emmaus, 1936–1937 (sold to the Boymans for 520,000 – 550,000 guldens, about US$300,000 or US$4 Million today)
Interior with Drinkers 1937–1938 (sold to D G. van Beuningen for 219,000 – 220,000 guldens about US$120,000 or US$1.6 million today)
The Last Supper I, 1938–1939
Interior with Cardplayers 1938 - 1939 (sold to W. van der Vorm for 219,000 – 220,000 guldens US$120,000 or US$1.6 million today)
The Head of Christ, 1940–1941 (sold to D G. van Beuningen for 400,000 – 475,000 guldens about US$225,000 or US$3.25 million today)
The Last Supper II, 1940–1942 (sold to D G. van Beuningen for 1,600,000 guldens about US$600,000 or US$7 million today)
The Blessing of Jacob 1941–1942 (sold to W. van der Vorm for 1,270,000 guldens about US$500,000 or US$5.75 million today)
Christ with the Adulteress 1941–1942 (sold to Hermann Göring for 1,650,000 guldens about US$624,000 or US$6.75 million today, now in the public collection of Museum de Fundatie)
The Washing of the Feet 1941–1943 (sold to the Netherlands state for 1,250,000 – 1,300,000 guldens about US$500,000 or US$5.3 million today, on display at the Rijksmuseum)
Jesus among the Doctors September 1945 (painted during trial under Court's control, and sold at auction for 3,000 guldens, about US$800 or US$7,000 today)
The Procuress given to the Courtauld Institute as a fake in 1960 and confirmed as such by chemical analysis in 2011.

Posthumously, Van Meegeren's forgeries have been shown in exhibitions around the world, including exhibitions in Amsterdam (1952), Basel (1953), Zurich (1953), Haarlem in the Kunsthandel de Boer (1958), London (1961), Rotterdam (1971), Minneapolis (1973), Essen (1976–1977), Berlin (1977),  (1985), New York (1987), Berkeley, CA (1990), Munich (1991), Rotterdam (1996), The Hague (1996) and more recently at the Haagse Kunstkring, The Hague (2004) and Stockholm (2004), and have thus been made broadly accessible to the public.

Potential forgeries
It is possible that other fakes hang in art collections all over the world, probably in the style of 17th-century Dutch masters, including works in the style of Frans Hals and the school of Hals, Pieter de Hooch, and Gerard ter Borch. Jacques van Meegeren suggested that his father had created a number of other forgeries, during interviews with journalists regarding discussions with his father. Some of these paintings include:

Boy with a Little Dog and The Rommelpotspeler after Frans Hals. The Frans Hals catalogue by Frans L. M. Dony mentions four paintings by this name attributed to Frans Hals or the "school of Frans Hals". One of these could easily be by Van Meegeren.
A counterpart to Vermeer's Girl with a Pearl Earring. A painting called Smiling Girl hangs in the National Gallery of Art in Washington, D.C. (bequest Andrew W. Mellon) that could fit with Jacques’ description and has been recognized by the museum as a fake. It was attributed to Theo van Wijngaarden, friend and partner of Van Meegeren, but may have been painted by Van Meegeren.
Lady with a Blue Hat after Vermeer which was sold to Baron Heinrich Thyssen in 1930. Its present whereabouts are unknown. It is often referred to as the “Greta Garbo” Vermeer.

Original artwork
Van Meegeren was a prolific artist and produced thousands of original paintings in a number of diverse styles. This wide range in painting and drawing styles often irritated art critics. Some of his typical works are classical still lifes in convincing 17th century manner, Impressionistic paintings of people frolicking on lakes or beaches, jocular drawings where the subject is drawn with rather odd features, Surrealistic paintings with combined fore- and backgrounds. Van Meegeren's portraits, however, are probably his finest works.

Among his original works is his famous Deer, pictured above. Other works include his prize-winning St. Laurens Cathedral; a Portrait of the actress Jo Oerlemans (his second wife); his Night Club; from the Roaring Twenties; the cheerful watercolor A Summer Day on the Beach and many others.

The forger forged

Van Meegeren's own work rose in price after he had become known as a forger, and it consequently became worthwhile to fake his paintings, as well. Existing paintings obtained a signature "H. van Meegeren", or new pictures were made in his style and falsely signed. When Van Meegeren saw a fake like that, he ironically remarked that he would have adopted them if they had been good enough, but regrettably he had not yet seen one.

Later on, however, his son Jacques van Meegeren started to fake his father's work. He made paintings in his father's style – although of much lower quality – and was able to place a perfect signature on these imitations. Many fakes – both by Jacques and by others – are still on the market. They can be recognized by their low pictorial quality, but are not always regarded as such.

Notes and references

Kreuger, Frederik H. (2007) A New Vermeer, Life and Work of Han van Meegeren. Rijswijk, Holland: Quantes.

Further reading

List of Works
 Kreuger, Frederik H. (2013). Han van Meegeren Revisited. His Art & a List of his Works, Fourth enlarged edition. Quantes Publishers Rijswijk, Delft 2013. 

Source
 Arend Hendrik Huussen Jr.: Henricus (Han) Antonius van Meegeren (1889 - 1945). Documenten betreffende zijn leven en strafproces. (Cahiers uit het noorden 20), Zoetermeer, Huussen 2009.
 Arend Hendrik Huussen Jr.: Henricus (Han) Antonius van Meegeren (1889 - 1945). Documenten, supplement. (Cahiers uit het noorden 21), Zoetermeer, Huussen 2010.

Han van Meegeren biographies
Baesjou, Jan (1956). The Vermeer forgeries: The story of Han van Meegeren. G. Bles. A biography/novel based on the author's conversations with van Meegeren's second wife. 
Brandhof, Marijke van den (1979): Een vroege Vermeer uit 1937: Achtergronden van leven en werken van de schilder/vervalser Han van Meegeren. Utrecht: Spectrum, 1979. The only scholarly biography of van Meegeren. An English-language summary is offered by Werness (1983).

Godley, John Raymond Lord Kilbracken (1967). Van Meegeren: A case history. London: Thomas Nelson and Sons, Ltd. 1967, New York: Charles Scribner's Sons. The standard English-language account, based on the author's literature research and conversations with van Meegeren's son and daughter.
 This "novel" ("romanzo") itself is a sort of forgery. As Henry Keazor in the German newspaper Frankfurter Rundschau could show in 2005 (see: "Gefälscht!", April 12, 2005, No. 84, Forum Humanwissenschaften, p. 16), Guarnieri has copied large parts of his book (sometime word by word) from Lord Kilbracken's 1967-biography. Since Guarnieri's brother Giovanni works as a translator, [see: ] Luigi easily could have had the English text translated into the Italian. Keazor shows that Guarnieri tried to cover his tracks by not referring to the book by Kilbracken – he only mentions (p. 212) his earlier and different book (Master Art Forger. The story of Han van Meegeren, New York 1951) which, however, was published under Kilbracken's civil name "John Godley".
Isheden, Per-Inge (2007). van Meegeren—konstförfalskarnas konung [van Meegeren—king of art forgeries]. Kvällsstunden: Hemmets och familjens veckotidning 69(38), 3, 23. (In Swedish, with side-by-side examples of originals and van Meegeren's forgeries.)
Kreuger, Frederik H. (2007). A New Vermeer: Life and Work of Han van Meegeren. Quantes Publishers, Rijswijk 2007. 
Lopez, Jonathan (2008). The Man Who Made Vermeers. New York: Harcourt. .
Moiseiwitsch, Maurice (1964). The Van Meegeren mystery; a biographical study. London: A. Barker. 

Wynne, Frank (2006). I was Vermeer: the rise and fall of the twentieth century's greatest forger. New York: Bloomsbury. .

Novels about or inspired by Han van Meegeren

Films about or inspired by Han van Meegeren
Peter Greenaway's A Zed & Two Noughts (1985). In this film Gerard Thoolen plays "Van Meegeren", a surgeon and painter modeled after Han van Meegeren.
Jan Botermans and Gustav Maguel (1951). Van Meegeren's false Vermeers [Film]. (See Sepp Schueller, p. 57.)

Dan Friedkin's The Last Vermeer (2019), in which Han van Meegeren is played by Guy Pearce.

Plays inspired by Han van Meegeren
Bruce J. Robinson (2007). Another Vermeer [Play]. Produced by the Abingdon Theatre Company of New York City
Ian Walker (playwright). Ghost in the Light [Play]. Produced by Second Wind Productions of San Francisco.
 David Jon Wiener. "The Master Forger" [Play]. Produced by Octad-One Productions Lakeside, CA and The Tabard Theatre London, England.

External links

Pictures in the Rijksmuseum Amsterdam
Photo from Van Meegeren's trial
The Meegeren website with many examples of Van Meegeren's own paintings, as well as updated information regarding his personal and professional life, compiled by Frederik H. Kreuger.

1889 births
1947 deaths
Art forgers
Delft University of Technology alumni
Dutch fraudsters
Johannes Vermeer
People acquitted of treason
People convicted of fraud
People from Deventer
20th-century Dutch painters
20th-century Dutch criminals
Dutch male painters
Articles containing video clips